The 1938 Clemson Tigers football team was an American football team that represented Clemson College in the Southern Conference during the 1938 college football season. In their eighth season under head coach Jess Neely, the Tigers compiled a 7–1–1 record (3–0–1 against conference opponents), finished second in the conference, and outscored opponents by a total of 145 to 56.

Center Charlie Woods was the team captain. The team's statistical leaders included tailback Bob Bailey with 272 passing yards, fullback Don Willis with 483 rushing yards, and tailback Banks McFadden and wingback Shad Bryant with 30 points scored (each with five touchdowns). McFadden remained with Clemson for more than 40 years as a coach and administrator and was inducted into the College Football Hall of Fame in 1959.

Two Clemson players were named to the All-Southern team: end Gus Goins and back Don Willis.

Schedule

References

Clemson
Clemson Tigers football seasons
Clemson Tigers football